The Libman Company is a privately held company that manufactures brooms, mops, and other household cleaning supplies. Libman is a market leader in the traditional cleaning tools segment. The company was established in 1896 in Chicago, Illinois by William Libman and has remained family-owned and operated. Its headquarters is currently located in Arcola, Illinois, where it employs 700 people at its facility. The company is notable for being one of the last-remaining manufacturers of corn brooms, as well as for internally manufacturing their own product components.

References

External links
 The Libman Company

Manufacturing companies based in Chicago
American companies established in 1896
Manufacturing companies established in 1896
Douglas County, Illinois